Chakrei  was a khum (commune) of Phnum Proek District in Battambang Province in north-western Cambodia.

It was the seat of Phnum Proek District.

Chakrei Commune had been renamed to Bour Commune according to the sub-decree no. 153 អនក្រ.បក dated July 7, 2011 by splitting the following 4 villages into Barang Thleak Commune of the same district.

 Hong Tuek
 Chakrei
 Tuol
 Chamkar Trab

Villages

 Tuol
 Chamkar Trab
 Hong Tuek
 Chakrei
 Damnakksan
 Ouda
 Phnomprampi
 Bou
 Anlongkrouch
 AnlongsIþ
 Spantomnab

References

Communes of Battambang province
Phnum Proek District